Zoller Glacier is a glacier in the Cathedral Rocks between Emmanuel and Darkowski Glaciers, flowing north into the Ferrar Glacier of Victoria Land. Charted by the British Antarctic Expedition under Scott, 1910–13. Named by the Advisory Committee on Antarctic Names (US-ACAN) in 1964 for Lieutenant John E. Zoller, U.S. Navy, chaplain with the winter party of 1957 at Little America V.

References
 

Glaciers of Scott Coast